Ruby Sahali is a Filipino politician who represented the lone district of Tawi-Tawi in the Autonomous Region in Muslim Mindanao from 2013 until her re-election defeat in 2019.  She is the eldest daughter of former Tawi-Tawi Governor Sadikul A. Sahali and the sister of Nurbert M. Sahali and former mayor of Panglima Sugala, Rejie Sahali-Generale.

References

Living people
Governors of Tawi-Tawi
Members of the House of Representatives of the Philippines from Tawi-Tawi
Year of birth missing (living people)
Place of birth missing (living people)
Filipino Muslims